The ICC Africa Twenty20 Championship was an international Twenty20 cricket competition that formed part of the qualification process for the ICC World Twenty20. It was contested by associate and affiliate members of the International Cricket Council (ICC) located in Africa. It ran from 2011 to 2016. The Africa Twenty20 Championship comprised three divisions, which operated on a system of promotion and relegation. Each division was contested (as a standalone tournament) approximately every two years, in line with the World Twenty20. The teams finishing first and second at the Division One tournament were promoted to the World Twenty20 Qualifier, along with the top teams from other regional qualifiers.

Division One
Both the first and second Division One tournaments were held in Kampala, Uganda, and featured five teams. The number of teams was increased to six for the 2015 edition, which was held in Benoni, South Africa (a neutral venue). Namibia did not participate in the 2013 Division One tournament, as it had already qualified for the 2013 World Twenty20 Qualifier (by virtue of placing in the top six at the 2012 event).

Results

Performance by team
Legend
 – Champions
 – Runners-up
 – Third place
✕ – Did not participate (already qualified for World Twenty20 Qualifier)
    — Hosts

Division two

Results

Performance by team
Legend
 – Champions
 – Runners-up
 – Third place
Q – Qualified
✕ – Did not participate (already qualified for a higher division)

Division Three

Results

Performance by team
Legend
 – Champions
 – Runners-up
 – Third place
✕ – Did not participate (already qualified for a higher division)

See also
 ICC Africa Under-19 Championships
 ICC Africa Women's T20 Championship

References

Africa
Cricket in Africa
Recurring sporting events established in 2011